Michael Ringier (born 30 March 1949) is a Swiss publisher. He is the Chairman of the Swiss media company Ringier.

Life 
Born in Zofingen, his parents are Hans and Eva Ringier (born Landolt). Ringier attended the University of St. Gallen from 1970 to 1972. In 1973, he began to work as a journalist for the Münchner Abendzeitung. After attending courses at a journalism school and editorial stations in his family's media company, Ringier completed a trainee program at Heinrich Bauer Verlag in Hamburg in 1976/77. He then worked for the business editorial staff of the Stern and conceived (also for Gruner + Jahr) the magazin impulse. In the Cologne editorial department, he headed the department of "Business Administration and Business" from 1980 onwards.

Private life 
Ringier is married to the law graduate Ellen Ringier (born Lüthy) and has two adopted daughters. Ringier is considered a proven art collector with a collection of more than 4,000 works of contemporary art and lives in a modern villa on Lake Zurich. He likes to spend his holidays in his holiday home in Engadin. Ringier likes to jog and is a passionate tennis and golf player.

Ringier AG 
In 1983, he returned to Switzerland, where he took over the responsibility for New Media and the German market in the Ringier AG. In 1985, Michael Ringier was CEO of Ringier AG. In 1991, as Chairman of the Board of Directors, he took over sole responsibility for the company. In 1997, he resigned as Chairman of the Board and took over the operational leadership of Ringier AG, as delegate of the board of directors. He also took over publishing management of the publisher. In 2003, Ringier became Chairman of Ringier Holding AG.

Other activities
 Swiss Institute Contemporary Art New York, Member of the Board of Trustees (since 2016)

Literature 
 Michael Ringier Biography, in the Munzinger-Archiv
 Ringen um Ringier, Über die Kunst der Digitalisierung in einem Schweizer Medienkonzern, René Lüchinger, Steidl, Göttingen 2019,

External links 
 Michael Ringier on the website from Ringier
 In der digitalen Welt stochern wir alle im Nebel. Article in: Frankfurter Allgemeine Zeitung from 9 May 2008
 Michael Ringier. Interview

References 

Swiss publishers (people)
Swiss businesspeople
1949 births
Stern (magazine) people
University of St. Gallen alumni
Living people